Anna Margaretha Geiger (1783–1809) was a German pastellist. Her middle name is sometimes given as Margarete or Margareta.

In 1806 she went to Bamberg and Munich, and studied with Johann Christian von Mannlich. She settled in Munich, but upon her father's death her health began to fail and she soon died. A self-portrait of 1804 is in the collection of the Mainfränkisches Museum.

References

1783 births
1809 deaths
German women painters
19th-century German painters
19th-century German women artists
Pastel artists
People from Schweinfurt